Knyazhichi is a rural locality (a village) in Kupriyanovskoye Rural Settlement, Gorokhovetsky District, Vladimir Oblast, Russia. The population was 2 as of 2010.

Geography 
Knyazhichi is located 18 km southwest of Gorokhovets (the district's administrative centre) by road. Arefino is the nearest rural locality.

References 

Rural localities in Gorokhovetsky District